Blomberg Lake and Woods State Natural Area is a Wisconsin Department of Natural Resources-designated State Natural Area made up of  of land. The state natural area is named after the  bog lake in the center of the protected area. The area is rich in plant life such as; sphagnum moss, cranberry, tawny cottongrass (Eriophorum virginicum), pod-grass, three-way sedge and multiple trees such as aspen, speckled alder, black spruce, and red maple.

Land cover
The remaining  are made up of Blomberg Lake and non-forested wetlands.

See also
Amsterdam Sloughs Wildlife Area

References

External links
U.S. Geological Survey Map at the U.S. Geological Survey Map Website. Retrieved April fifth, 2022.
Surface Water Data Viewer at the WDNR Interactive Map Website. Retrieved April fifth, 2022.

Protected areas established in 2003
Protected areas of Burnett County, Wisconsin
State Natural Areas of Wisconsin
Lakes of Wisconsin
Landforms of Burnett County, Wisconsin
2003 establishments in Wisconsin